Elmo Harold Langley (August 21, 1928 – November 21, 1996) was a NASCAR driver and owner. Langley primarily used the number 64 on his race cars during his NASCAR career.

Racing career
Langley began his racing career racing modified cars in Virginia and Maryland in 1952. Langley came into NASCAR as a Driver/Owner in 1954. In 1966 he partnered with Henry Woodfield and created Langley-Woodfield Racing.  That same year Langley won the only two races of his long career.  After the second race of the 1969 season, Langley and Woodfield split and Langley continued to run the team on his own returning to the driver/owner role.

Langley finished 5th in season points in 1969 and 1971, 6th in 1968 and 1970, 7th in 1972, 8th in 1975, and 9th in 1967 and 1973. His final full season was as a driver for Langley Racing in 1975.

He continued to drive in a few select races until 1981 when he hung up the helmet for good.  Langley began to field his familiar #64 for other drivers to develop their career including Tommy Gale, Joe Millikan, Jimmy Hensley and Ken Schrader. Langley shut down his team after the 1987 season.

On April 15, 1988, Langley was named as the crew chief for Cale Yarborough and Dale Jarrett with his duties in effect after that year's First Union 400 where he attended as an observer.

Elmo's very last race was the Battle of the NASCAR Legends race at Charlotte Motor Speedway in 1991. The race featured such drivers as Cale Yarborough, Junior Johnson, Pete Hamilton, and Donnie Allison. The winner was Langley, beating Yarborough to the line by about 3 feet on the last lap.

From April 1989 through November 1996, Langley served as the official pace car driver for all Winston Cup events. Dale Earnhardt and Rusty Wallace were well known to bump and draft his car during pace laps.

Personal life
Langley was married to Nancy and had four sons; Elmo Jr., Raymond, William and Steven. He lived in Harrisburg, North Carolina.

Death
On November 21, 1996, Langley was in Suzuka, Japan to drive the pace car in the NASCAR Thunder Special Suzuka exhibition race which was held on November 24. During a test drive, he began to experience chest pains. He was subsequently taken to the Suzuka General Hospital where he was pronounced dead when his heart stopped beating before arrival. NASCAR legend and TBS Superstation analyst Buddy Baker was in the pace car at the time Langley suffered his heart attack, and was one of the last people to see Langley still alive.

Motorsports career results

NASCAR
(key) (Bold – Pole position awarded by qualifying time. Italics – Pole position earned by points standings or practice time. * – Most laps led.)

Grand National Series

Winston Cup Series

Daytona 500

References

External links

Photo and Biography

1928 births
1996 deaths
Burials in North Carolina
NASCAR drivers
NASCAR team owners
People from Landover, Maryland
Racing drivers from Maryland
People from Harrisburg, North Carolina